Pagameopsis is a genus of flowering plants belonging to the family Rubiaceae.

Its native range is Southern Venezuela to Northern Brazil.

Species:

Pagameopsis garryoides 
Pagameopsis maguirei

References

Rubiaceae
Rubiaceae genera